Gérard Kerbrat (born 1 April 1956) is a French former professional racing cyclist. He rode in the 1982 Tour de France.

References

External links
 

1956 births
Living people
French male cyclists
Sportspeople from Brest, France
Cyclists from Brittany